Sowmaeh Del (also Romanized as Şowma‘eh Del, Şowme‘eh Del, and Şowmeh Del; also known as Sumadi, Sumadil, and Suma-Dyl’) is a village in Ozomdel-e Jonubi Rural District, in the Central District of Varzaqan County, East Azerbaijan Province, Iran. At the 2006 census, its population was 1,369, in 321 families.

References 

Towns and villages in Varzaqan County